Many ships of the French Navy have borne the name Néréide, after the Nereid (sea nymphs): 

 Néréide (1690), a galley
 Néréide (1696), a 20-gun frigate
 , a 42-gun frigate, broken up in 1743.
The French recaptured her in 1810 during the Battle of Grand Port; she was broken up after being badly damaged.
She was struck from the Navy list in 1819.
 , a 46-gun frigate which bore the name Rancune
 , a 52-gun frigate
 , a  launched in 1914 and struck in 1935

French Navy ship names